Bebuloh is a small village in Labuan, Malaysia.

 
Labuan